There are at least 269 named lakes and reservoirs in Flathead County, Montana.

Lakes
 Margaret Lake, el. 
 Marion Lake, el. 
 Martha Lake, el. 
 Martin Lakes, el. 
 Mary Baker Lake, el. 
 McGilvray Lake, el. 
 McGregor Lake, el. 
 Meadow Lake, el. 
 Middle Foy Lake, el. 
 Middle Quartz Lake, el. 
 Miller Lake, el. 
 Molly Lake, el. 
 Moose Country Pond, el. 
 Moose Lake, el. 
 Moose Lake, el. 
 Morning Slough, el. 
 Mud Lake, el. 
 Mud Lake, el. 
 Mud Lake, el. 
 Mud Lake, el. 
 Murray Lake, el. 
 Mystery Lake, el. 
 Nasukoin Lake, el. 
 North Biglow Lake, el. 
 Northwestern Lake, el. 
 Numa Lake, el. 
 Nyack Lakes, el. 
 Ole Lake, el. 
 Ole Lake, el. 
 Olive Lake, el. 
 Olor Lake, el. 
 Palisade Lake, el. 
 Peterson Lake, el. 
 Picnic Lakes, el. 
 Picture Lake, el. 
 Pilgrim Lakes, el. 
 Plummers Lake, el. 
 Pocket Lake, el. 
 Pot Lake, el. 
 Pratt Lake (Montana), el. 
 Quartz Lake, el. 
 Rainbow Lake, el. 
 Recluse Lake, el. 
 Red Meadow Lake, el. 
 Reeds Slough, el. 
 Rock Lake, el. 
 Rogers Lake, el. 
 Ruger Lake, el. 
 Sampson Lake (Montana), el. 
 Sawdust Lake, el. 
 Scott Lake, el. 
 Seven Winds of the Lake, el. 
 Shadow Lake, el. 
 Shelf Lake (Montana), el. 
 Skookum Lake, el. 
 Skyles Lake, el. 
 Smith Lake, el. 
 Smith Lake, el. 
 Smokey Lake, el. 
 Snyder Lake, el. 
 Soldier Lake, el. 
 Spencer Lake (Montana), el. 
 Spill Lake, el. 
 Spoon Lake, el. 
 Spotted Bear Lake, el. 
 Spring Lake, el. 
 Spring Lakes, el. 
 Spruce Lake (Montana), el. 
 Stanton Lake, el. 
 Strawberry Lake, el. 
 Striped Elk Lake, el. 
 Sunburst Lake, el. 
 Sunday Lakes, el. 
 Swimming Lake, el. 
 Sylvia Lake (Montana), el. 
 Tally Lake, el. 
 Talmadge Lake, el. 
 Tamarack Lake (Montana), el. 
 Tepee Lake, el. 
 Thornberg Lake, el. 
 Three Bears Lake, el. 
 Three Eagles Lakes, el. 
 Tom Tom Lake, el. 
 Trilobite Lakes, el. 
 Trout Lake, el. 
 Twin Lakes, el. 
 Twin Lakes, el. 
 Upper Isabel Lake, el. 
 Upper Kintla Lake, el. 
 Upper Snyder Lake, el. 
 Upper Stillwater Lake, el. 
 Upper Whitefish Lake, el. 
 Wall Lake, el. 
 Whale Lake, el. 
 Whitefish Lake, el. 
 Wildcat Lake, el. 
 Wileys Slough, el. 
 Winona Lake, el. 
 Woods Lake (Montana), el. 
 Woods Lake (Flathead County, Montana), el.

Reservoirs
 Pearson Reservoir, el.

See also
 List of lakes in Montana
 List of lakes in Flathead County, Montana (A-L)

Notes

FlatheadM-Z